The 1897 Cincinnati Reds season was a season in American baseball. The team finished in fourth place in the National League with a record of 76–56, 17 games behind the Boston Beaneaters.

Offseason 
The Cincinnati Reds were coming off a fairly successful season in 1896. They had been in first place late in the year, but the team struggled badly over the last part of the season. to finish in third place in the National League with a 77–50 record. This marked the second consecutive season that the Reds collapsed at the end of the year.

Player-manager Buck Ewing returned to the club, but would retire from playing and focus on just being the manager. The Reds made a deal in the off-season, as Cincinnati traded away Germany Smith, Chauncey Fisher and $1,000 to the Brooklyn Bridegrooms for Tommy Corcoran. Corcoran was coming off a season in which he hit .289 with three home runs and 73 RBI with the Bridegrooms in 1896. The team also purchased pitcher Ted Breitenstein from the St. Louis Browns for $10,000. Breitenstein was 18–26 with the Browns with a 4.48 ERA in 43 starts in 1896. His best season had been in 1894 when he was 27–23 with a 4.79 ERA, while leading the National League with 50 starts, 46 complete games and 447.1 innings pitched. Breitenstein also led the NL with a 3.18 ERA in 1893 while in St. Louis.

Regular season

Season summary 
The Reds started the season off hot, winning their first six games, and would remain hot, as they were 19–7 in their first twenty-six games, only half a game behind the first place Baltimore Orioles. At that time, the New York Giants released Jake Beckley, and the Reds immediately signed him to take over first base. Despite their new addition, Cincinnati fell into a slump, winning only eight of eighteen games to fall into third place, 6.5 games behind the first place Orioles. The Reds then snapped out of their losing ways, as they won twelve of their next thirteen games to move back into second. However, they still remained 4.5 games out of first with a 39–18 record. Cincinnati remained in the pennant race until late August, when they went on a ten-game losing streak to fall into fourth place, eleven games out of first. They remained in fourth place for the rest of the season, finishing with a 76–56 record, 17 games behind the Boston Beaneaters.

Notable performances 
Beckley, who the Reds acquired during the season, led the team offensively, batting .345 with seven home runs and 76 RBI, all team highs. Dusty Miller had another solid year, batting .316 with four homers and 70 RBI, while Tommy Corcoran batted .288 with three home runs and 57 RBI in his first year as a Red.

On the mound, Ted Breitenstein led the way, leading the team with a 23–12 record with a 3.62 ERA in 40 games, completing 32 of them. Billy Rhines was solid also, posting a record of 21–15 with a 4.08 ERA, while Frank Dwyer was 18–13 with an ERA of 3.78.

Season standings

Record vs. opponents

Roster

Player stats

Batting

Starters by position 
Note: Pos = Position; G = Games played; AB = At bats; H = Hits; Avg. = Batting average; HR = Home runs; RBI = Runs batted in

Other batters 
Note: G = Games played; AB = At bats; H = Hits; Avg. = Batting average; HR = Home runs; RBI = Runs batted in

Pitching

Starting pitchers 
Note: G = Games pitched; IP = Innings pitched; W = Wins; L = Losses; ERA = Earned run average; SO = Strikeouts

Other pitchers 
Note: G = Games pitched; IP = Innings pitched; W = Wins; L = Losses; ERA = Earned run average; SO = Strikeouts

References

External links
1897 Cincinnati Reds season at Baseball Reference

Cincinnati Reds seasons
Cincinnati Reds season
Cincinnati Reds